Pitchcapping is a form of torture which involves pouring hot pitch or tar (mainly used at the time for water-proofing seams in the sides of ships and boats) into a conical paper cap and forcing it onto an individual's head, which is then allowed to cool before being rapidly removed. Typically, victims of pitchcapping suffer loss of skin and tissue around their head. The practise of pitchcapping dates back to the period of classical antiquity, but was used most prominently during the suppression of the Irish Rebellion of 1798. Pitchcapping was usually preceded by the hasty shaving of the victim's hair, and the effect it had resembled scalping in the injuries inflicted. In other forms of pitchcapping, pitch or tar was poured into the victim's orifices instead, though since doing so invariably proved fatal, was more akin to a form of execution instead. Another form of pitchcapping involved smearing cloth or a piece of paper with pitch and pressing it onto the head of the victim. 

Early antecedents of pitchcapping were used in the period of classical antiquity, when hot liquids, including molten metals, were used as a form of execution. Mithridates VI of Pontus executed Roman consul Manius Aqullius in 88 BC using molten gold, while it was rumoured that Marcus Licinius Crassus was killed using a similar method by the Parthians after being defeated at the Battle of Carrhae in 53 BC, though this most likely occurred after his death. During the Irish Rebellion of 1798 against British rule in Ireland, government forces, in particular the militia and yeomanry, frequently used pitchcapping against suspected rebels. A prominent victim of  pitchcapping was Anthony Perry, a leader of the Wexford Rebellion.

Society of United Irishmen member Myles Byrne described pitchcapping in his memoirs:

 Flogging, half hanging, picketing, were mild tortures in comparison of the pitch caps that were applied to the heads of those who happened to wear their hair short, called croppies; the head being completely singed, a cap made of strong linen well imbued with boiling pitch was so closely put on that it could not be taken off without bringing off a part of the skin and flesh from the head : in many instances the tortured victim had one of his ears cut off to satisfy the executioner that if he escaped he could readily be discovered, being so well marked."

See also

 Tarring and feathering

References

 "The Peoples Rising - Wexford in 1798" (1995) Daniel Gahan 
 "Pitchcap and Triangle - The Cork Militia in the Wexford Rising" (1998), J. M. Barry 
 "Fr. John Murphy of Boolavogue" (1991) Nicholas Furlong 

Corporal punishments
Irish Rebellion of 1798
Physical torture techniques
Suffering
Torture